Krzemiński is a Polish surname. Notable people with the surname include:

 Adam Krzemiński (born 1945), Polish journalist and commentator
 Kazimierz Krzemiński (1902–?), Polish cyclist
 Wojciech Krzemiński (1933-2017), Polish astronomer

Polish-language surnames